Maximilian Ritscher (born 11 January 1994) is an Austrian footballer who last played for LASK Juniors OÖ.

References

External links
 
 

Austrian footballers
Austrian Football Bundesliga players
2. Liga (Austria) players
Kapfenberger SV players
Wolfsberger AC players
1994 births
Living people
Association football defenders
People from Lienz
Footballers from Tyrol (state)